Daniela Stracchi (born 2 September 1983) is an Italian football midfielder. She plays for Atalanta Mozzanica in the women's Serie A.

Club career
She have played for ASD Fiammamonza 1970, since 2006, and ASD Torres Calcio since 2008. In the July 2014 signs an agreement with ASD Mozzanica, club of homonymous town in the province of Bergamo, Lombardy.

International career
She was called up to be part of the national team for the UEFA Women's Euro 2013.

Honours

Club

ASD Fiammamonza	
 Serie A: Winner 2005-06
 Italian Women's Super Cup: Winner 2005-06

ASD Torres Calcio
 Serie A: Winner 2009–10, 2010–11, 2011–12, 2012-13
 Italian Women's Super Cup: Winner 2008–09, 2009–10, 2010–11, 2011–12, 2012–13
 Italian Women's Cup: Winner 2010-11

References

External links
 
 Profile at fussballtransfers.com
 
 Profile at soccerdonna.de

1983 births
Living people
Italian women's footballers
Italy women's international footballers
Torres Calcio Femminile players
Women's association football midfielders
ASD Fiammamonza 1970 players
Serie A (women's football) players
Atalanta Mozzanica Calcio Femminile Dilettantistico players
UEFA Women's Euro 2017 players